A Service Award Cross (Dienstauszeichnungskreuz) was an award for long-time service as a civil servant or member of the military.  Prussia had a service cross for 25-years service for officers as well as service awards in the form of buckles for nine-, 15 - and 25-years' service in the active Army.

In addition, there was a Landwehr Service Award in two categories: a cross for 20-years service by officers and a buckle for 12-years' service by officers and men of the Landwehr if they took part in a campaign or had served at least three months on active service convened for an extraordinary initiative.

Similar rules and orders - mostly in Prussian-like orders - were produced in the kingdoms of Bavaria and Saxony.  Even in the Weimar Republic, the Third Reich and other states there were distinctions for long periods of service.  The German Federal Republic had service awards, not restored on German unification.

See also
Service award

Military history of Germany
Orders, decorations, and medals of Prussia
Long service medals